Pierre Marie Robert Versteegh (June 6, 1888 in Kedoeng Banteng, Sragen, Dutch East Indies – May 3, 1942 in Sachsenhausen concentration camp) was a Dutch horse rider  who competed in the 1928 Summer Olympics and in the 1936 Summer Olympics.

In the 1928 Summer Olympics he won the bronze medal in the team dressage with his horse His Excellence after finishing ninth in the individual dressage.

Eight years later he finished fifth with the Dutch team in the team dressage and placed eighth in the individual dressage.

The Kdo Oranienburg executed him by firing squad. Versteegh is one of 95 people who, most posthumously, received the Dutch Cross of Resistance after World War II.

References

External links
profile

1888 births
1942 deaths
People from Sragen Regency
Graduates of the Koninklijke Militaire Academie
Royal Netherlands Army officers
Dutch dressage riders
Dutch male equestrians
Equestrians at the 1928 Summer Olympics
Equestrians at the 1936 Summer Olympics
Medalists at the 1928 Summer Olympics
Olympic bronze medalists for the Netherlands
Olympic equestrians of the Netherlands
Olympic medalists in equestrian
Dutch civilians killed in World War II
People who died in Sachsenhausen concentration camp
Dutch people executed in Nazi concentration camps
People executed by Nazi Germany by firing squad
Recipients of the Dutch Cross of Resistance 
Knights of the Order of Orange-Nassau
Resistance members killed by Nazi Germany
20th-century Dutch people